Kaznevo is a rural locality (a selo) in Lyakhovskoye Rural Settlement, Melenkovsky District, Vladimir Oblast, Russia. The population was 47 as of 2010. There are 5 streets.

Geography 
Kaznevo is located on the Oka River, 24 km southeast of Melenki (the district's administrative centre) by road. Lyakhi is the nearest rural locality.

References 

Rural localities in Melenkovsky District